Alassane Sow (born 3 January 1997) is a Senegalese footballer who last played for Bizertin.

Career statistics

Club

Notes

References

1997 births
Living people
Senegalese footballers
Senegal youth international footballers
Senegalese expatriate footballers
Association football midfielders
Tunisian Ligue Professionnelle 1 players
Real Zaragoza players
CA Bizertin players
Expatriate footballers in Spain
Expatriate footballers in Tunisia
Senegalese expatriate sportspeople in Spain
Senegalese expatriate sportspeople in Tunisia